Danuta Nowak-Stachow (22 August 1934 – 14 June 2019) was a Polish gymnast. She competed at the 1956 Summer Olympics and the 1960 Summer Olympics, winning a bronze medal at the 1956 Games.

References

1934 births
2019 deaths
Polish female artistic gymnasts
Olympic gymnasts of Poland
Gymnasts at the 1956 Summer Olympics
Gymnasts at the 1960 Summer Olympics
Sportspeople from Gdynia
Olympic medalists in gymnastics
Olympic bronze medalists for Poland
Medalists at the 1956 Summer Olympics